The Victory cave is situated near the Dangi Canyon in Nookat District, Kyrgyzstan, 6 km north of the town Nookat.

The crevice at the watershed of the range leads to a maze of underground passages and cavities created by the rising flow of thermal springs.

References

External links
  Surprise cave

Caves of Kyrgyzstan
Osh Region